Antti Bruun (born 9 November 1979) is a Finnish former professional ice hockey defenceman.

Bruun played in the Liiga for Ilves, SaiPa, Lukko and HPK. He also played in Sweden's Elitserien for Mora IK and HockeyAllsvenskan for the Malmö Redhawks, as well as 22 games in the Slovak Extraliga for HKm Zvolen in 2009 and 22 games for HC Bolzano of Italy's Serie A in 2011.

Career statistics

References

External links

1979 births
Living people
Bolzano HC players
Finnish ice hockey defencemen
HPK players
Ilves players
Kokkolan Hermes players
KOOVEE players
Lempäälän Kisa players
Lukko players
Malmö Redhawks players
Mora IK players
People from Savonlinna
SaiPa players
SaPKo players
HKM Zvolen players
Sportspeople from South Savo
20th-century Finnish people
Finnish expatriate ice hockey players in Slovakia
Finnish expatriate ice hockey players in Sweden
Finnish expatriate ice hockey players in Italy